Typhoon Longwang, known in the Philippines as Typhoon Maring, was the deadliest tropical cyclone to impact China during the 2005 Pacific typhoon season. Longwang was first identified as a tropical depression on September 25 north of the Mariana Islands. Moving along a general westward track, the system quickly intensified and reached typhoon status on September 27. After reaching Category 4-equivalent intensity on the Saffir–Simpson hurricane scale, adverse atmospheric conditions along with internal structural changes resulted in temporary weakening. The structural change culminated in Longwang becoming an annular typhoon and prompted re-intensification. Interaction with the mountainous terrain of the island and further structural changes caused some weakening before the typhoon made landfall near Hualien City early on October 2. Crossing the island in six hours, Longwang emerged over the Taiwan Strait before moving onshore again later that day, this time in Fujian Province, China as a minimal typhoon. Once over mainland China, the storm quickly weakened and ultimately dissipated late on October 3.

Prior to the storm's arrival, officials in Taiwan activated all emergency operations centers and urged residents to take serious precautions. Despite the intensity of the storm, damage was relatively limited there. Two people died, 73 were injured, and damage reached NT$570 million (US$17.7 million). Large-scale evacuations took place in mainland China, with 684,860 people relocating. Losses were extensive in Fujian Province where 1-in-100 year rains caused disastrous flooding in Fuzhou, killing 62 people. In Minhou County, 85 paramilitary police perished when a landslide destroyed their barracks. Throughout China, 147 people were killed and damage amounted to 7.81 billion RMB (US$944.6 million). Due to the severe damage, the name Longwang was later retired and replaced by Haikui.

Meteorological history

On September 24, 2005, the Joint Typhoon Warning Center (JTWC) began monitoring a tropical disturbance north of the Mariana Islands. Convective banding features soon consolidated around a low-pressure area associated with the system, prompting the issuance of a Tropical Cyclone Formation Alert the following day. Later on September 25, the Japan Meteorological Agency (JMA) declared the system a tropical depression. Situated in a region characterized by low wind shear and favorable upper-level divergence, steady intensification ensued. Early on September 26, the JTWC also classified the system as a tropical depression, designating it as 19W. Hours later, both agencies assessed sustained winds to have reached , indicating tropical storm intensity. As such, the JMA named the storm Longwang. Situated to the southwest of a ridge, the storm tracked slowly west-northwest, while strengthening at an increasing rate. A temporary turn northwest occurred on September 26 as Longwang approached a weakness in the ridge which had previously steered it west-northwestward. In the 24 hours following the storm's naming, Longwang quickly intensified into a typhoon. Once at typhoon status, the storm resumed a more westerly track as a second ridge extending from eastern Asia became the dominant steering factor.

On a westerly course toward Taiwan and eastern China, Longwang underwent a period of rapid intensification from September 27–28. At the end of this phase, the JMA assessed peak winds at  while the JTWC rated it as a Category 4-equivalent typhoon on the Saffir–Simpson hurricane scale. On September 29, the Philippine Atmospheric, Geophysical and Astronomical Services Administration assigned the typhoon the local name Maring as it entered their area of responsibility. The following day, Longwang underwent a structural change, transitioning from asymmetrical banding to symmetrical, making it an annular tropical cyclone. During the transition, upper-level divergence and outflow significantly decreased, resulting in temporary weakening of the typhoon. Additionally, an increase in westerly wind shear caused the interior structure to become asymmetric, with a southwest to northeast tilt noted by dropsondes released by the Dropwinsonde Observations for Typhoon Surveillance project. The JMA assessed winds at  along with a barometric pressure of 930 mbar (hPa).

As the storm approached Taiwan late on October 1, an eyewall replacement cycle began, with a large secondary eyewall forming around the inner one. Interaction with the mountainous terrain of Taiwan caused Longwang to weaken somewhat. The system ultimately made landfall near Hualien City at 0500 UTC on October 2. Just six hours after moving inland, Longwang emerged over the Taiwan Strait with its circulation mostly intact; however, weakening continued as it approached eastern China. Remaining over water for less than 12 hours, the typhoon made its second and ultimate landfall in Fujian Province around 1800 UTC on October 2 (0200 October 3 local time). The storm quickly degraded over the following day, with winds decreasing below gale-force within 12 hours. The former typhoon slowed and turned northward over western Fujian before dissipating late on October 3.

Preparations

The first indications of Longwang impacting Taiwan were on September 27, when the Central Weather Bureau (CWB) stated the storm was on a westerly course to the island. On September 30, the CWB issued a sea warning for areas surrounding Taiwan. Shortly after, the island's Central Emergency Operations Center was activated. Early on October 1, the whole of Taiwan was placed under a storm warning, prompting the Emergency Center to go to its maximum alert level. Daily meetings held by the Emergency Center provided officials with information on the storm and its expected impacts. Details from the meetings prompted the activation of all emergency operation centers in Taiwan. Nine counties were placed under debris flow advisories by the end of October 1.

On October 2, then-President Chen Shui-bian urged all residents to take serious precautions. 2,280 mountain climbers were advised to leave, the majority of whom complied. The Taiwan Railway Administration suspended operations on four rail lines. Rapid transit lines in Taipei maintained operations, though ran on slower schedules. For southern Taiwan, the main risk was fresh water flooding. Fifteen rivers were placed under high alert while 340 more were under moderate alert.

By the time Longwang made landfall, 37 shelters opened across the island, accommodating nearly 1,000 people. Additionally, 5,464 Chinese fishermen temporarily sheltered at Taiwanese ports. All airports were closed on October 2 and sea travel was suspended. With international airports shut down, President Chen, who was returning from a visit to the United Arab Emirates, was forced to land in Indonesia. The landing in Indonesia was seen as a political breakthrough for Taiwan as Indonesia does not recognize them as a separate nation from China.

By October 1, officials in Mainland China issued warnings for Fujian Province and urged residents to evacuate. An estimated 537,000 people heeded these warnings in Fujian and a further 86,000 and 61,860 evacuated in Zhejiang and Guangdong provinces, respectively. The majority of evacuees were from the cities of Ningde, Fuzhou, Putian, Quanzhou, Xiamen, and Zhangzhou, with 376,000 evacuating from Xiamen alone. Along the coast, roughly 38,000 seagoing vessels returned to port. Thousands of officials in the province oversaw flood preparations. Public transportation across Fujian Province was temporarily suspended as well. The airport in Xiamen shut down late on October 2 as rain bands from the storm began impacting the area. Throughout Fujian, more than 120 flights were canceled.

Impact

On October 1, Typhoon Longwang brushed the southern Ryukyu Islands of Japan. These winds caused travel disruptions, minor damage, and scattered power outages. Four people sustained minor injuries in Ishigaki City after being knocked down by the winds. Significant agricultural damage took place as well, with losses in the sector reaching ¥1 billion (US$8.7 million).

Due to the substantial loss of life and damage, the name Longwang was retired and replaced with Haikui in 2006. The name was first used in the 2012 Pacific typhoon season.

Taiwan

Striking Taiwan as a powerful storm early on October 2, Longwang brought destructive winds to many areas along the island's east coast. These gusts were the highest ever recorded in the city, surpassing the previous record set during Typhoon Louise in 1959. On the west coast of Taiwan, gusts reached  in Wugi. Torrential rains impacted many areas, with a peak 24 hour accumulations in Hualien County reaching .

At the storm's height, 749,621 households lost power while 24,817 lost telephone service. In Hualien County, a man was killed after being struck in the head by an iron bar that crashed into his home; 33 others were injured in the county. At least one home collapsed and six others were damaged in the county. High waves broke a  stretch of a levee near ChiAnn, a coastal community in Hualien, and flooded nearby homes. Part of the entrance to the Hualien Martyrs Shrine collapsed amid strong winds. Billboards and trees fell across Hualien City, littering the streets with debris. Elsewhere on the island, 13 others sustained injuries and one person was reported missing. In Chiayi City, a bus and truck collided, injuring 16 and on Provincial Highway 16, 11 people were injured when their coach bus crashed into a telephone pole. It is unknown how much, if any, of a role the typhoon was in these accidents. In Kaohsiung, a concrete slab was torn off a building and wedged into a high rise apartment. One woman died after being swept away by flash flooding in the central town of Hoping. Along the coast, a 7,000 ton cargo vessel broke loose from its mooring and drifted for  before running aground and breaking apart.

Overall, 2 people died and 73 more were injured across Taiwan. Infrastructural damage was less than feared with losses amounting to NT$70 million (US$2.2 million). Then-Premier Frank Hsieh stated that the relative lack of damage "was some good fortune in the midst of this misfortune." Substantial agricultural took place, with rice, bananas, Chufeng grapes, and leafy
vegetables being the hardest hit. Losses in the sector exceeded NT$500 million (US$15 million). Though unrelated to the typhoon, a magnitude 5.4 earthquake struck Taiwan late on October 1, sending residents in Hualien panicking into streets despite the ongoing typhoon.

East China
Typhoon Longwang, weakened from its passage of Taiwan, struck mainland China late on October 2 as a low-end typhoon. Off the coast of Lianjiang County, gusts reached  on Xiayu Island. Though the storm brought typhoon-force winds, they were mostly confined to coastal areas and its greatest impacts resulted from torrential rains. Of that total,  fell in a 12‑hour span. These rains were described as a 1-in-100 year event. Zhejiang and Jiangxi Provinces also experienced heavy rains;  fell in Taizhou, Zhejiang while  was recorded in Nanfeng County, Jiangxi.

The greatest damage from Longwang took place in Fujian Province, especially within the city of Fuzhou where torrential rains overwhelmed the Jinan River and its tributaries. Direct losses from the flood in Fuzhou alone reached 2.2 billion RMB (US$264 million). A large auto plant owned by the Fujian Motor Industry Corporation, covering 83 hectares, was completely flooded. Many auto parts sustained heavy damage and losses at the plant reached 330 million RMB (US$39.9 million). In Minhou County, Fuzhou, a landslide destroyed a barracks of the Chinese paramilitary police where 142 officers were staying. Roughly 7,000 soldiers were deployed to the area for search and rescue. Ultimately, 47 people were rescued (39 of whom were hospitalized) and 85 bodies were recovered.

Striking during the week-long holiday following Chinese National Day, tourism suffered greatly in the region. Across China, 4.7 million people were directly affected by the typhoon, 4 million of whom were in Fujian Province. Preliminary assessments indicated that 9,400 homes were destroyed, leaving 129,400 people homeless. Fifty schools were damaged or destroyed as well. A total of 160,000 hectares (3.9 million acres) of farmland was damaged and 40,900 heads of livestock were lost. Total losses reached 7.81 billion RMB (US$944.6 million), nearly half of which took place in the industrial sector. Typhoon Longwang was the deadliest storm to strike China in 2005 with 147 lives lost.

Reconstruction and restoration within Fujian Province began shortly after the storm's passage. By October 6, power had been restored to most areas and roads were cleared. On November 13, five officers stationed at the barracks that was destroyed were punished as accountable for the deaths of the 85 cadets. Following an investigation by the Central Military Commission and State Council, all five were dismissed from their posts while Hou Yongjun, the director of the brigade, was to be prosecuted.

See also

Timeline of the 2005 Pacific typhoon season
List of storms named Longwang/Haikui
Typhoon Haikui — the replacement for Longwang, made a similar track.
Typhoon Dujuan (2015)
Typhoon Haitang (2005)
Typhoon Herb
Typhoon Sinlaku (2002)
Typhoon Megi (2016)

Notes

References

External links

RSMC Tokyo – Typhoon Center
Best Track Data of Typhoon Longwang (0519) 
Best Track Data (Graphics) of Typhoon Longwang (0519)
Best Track Data (Text)
JTWC Best Track Data of Typhoon 19W (Longwang)

2005 Pacific typhoon season
Retired Pacific typhoons
Typhoons in Japan
Typhoons in Taiwan
Typhoons in China
Typhoon Longwang
Typhoon Longwang
M
M
2005 in Taiwan
Typhoons
Tropical cyclones in 2005